Grays Lake is a wetland in Idaho, United States. It lies in Bonneville County and Caribou County. Grays Lake National Wildlife Refuge was established in the area in 1965. Ranching (cattle, sheep, hay production) is the predominant use of surrounding lands.

A variant name was "John Grays Lake". The lake was named after John Gray, a Canadian trapper.

General
Grays Lake lies within the Caribou Range of the Rocky Mountains in southeast Idaho, and is at the western edge of the Greater Yellowstone Ecosystem. The valley lies about 30 miles north of Soda Springs, Idaho and about 70 miles southwest of Jackson Hole, Wyoming. At the heart of the valley is a large,  shallow montane marsh, composed primarily of hardstem bulrush and cattail with scattered small ponds. This wetland system provides important habitat for breeding sandhill cranes, trumpeter swans, Franklin's gulls, white-faced ibis, dabbling and diving ducks, a variety of shore- and grassland birds, as well as habitat for molting and fall-staging waterfowl and cranes. The area is significant for its high density of breeding sandhill cranes and as a reintroduction site for trumpeter swans. The rich wet meadow edges of the marsh provide foraging and nesting habitat for a diversity of water birds each year.

Grays Lake National Wildlife Refuge encompasses much of the richest wetland habitat within the valley. It was established in 1965 to protect and restore habitat for waterfowl production, sandhill cranes, and other wildlife. In the 1970s and 1980s the refuge served as the focus of an effort to establish a second wild population of endangered whooping cranes. Currently, the refuge's goals are to enhance natural ecosystem functions to support a diversity of water birds and other wildlife.

Data
 Marsh elevation .
 Caribou Mountain to northeast highest point within watershed.

Climate

 Average annual precipitation .
 Average annual snowfall ; average accumulations of 40-50 inches (102 – 127 cm).
 Daytime high temperatures average 68-75 °F (20-24 °C) in June and July.
 Hard frosts (<30 °F (<-1 °C) may occur in any month.
 Record high of 103 °F (39 °C) recorded in 1919 and record low of –62 °F (-52 °C) on January 1, 1978.

Habitat and plant communities

 Transitional zone between Great Basin vegetation (south) and Rocky Mountain vegetation (north).
 Within approved refuge boundary, 60% palustrine emergent wetland, 20% wetland semi-wet meadow, 12% brush, grasslands, and grain fields, 5% shallow open water with submergents, and 3% aspen forest and willow thicket.
 Over 170 species of grasses, sedges and forbs in wet meadows and marsh habitat, including 15 species of sedges.
 3 species of exotic, invasive plants.
 7 species of trees and 17 species of shrubs
 No known threatened or endangered plant species.

Wildlife

 128 recorded species of breeding birds present.
 Over 40 bird species nesting in the wet meadow and wetland habitats of the basin.
 20 species of mammals.
 4 species of amphibians.
 6 species of reptiles.
 1 species protected as "threatened or endangered" (trumpeter swan).
 Highest breeding density of sandhill cranes in North America - an important breeding area for Rocky Mountain Population of sandhill cranes.
 700-800 cranes present in May; 1,000 or more cranes stage in the basin in September.
 Nesting colonies of Franklin's gulls and white-faced ibis.

Water

 Located within Willow Watershed, 651.45 mi2 (1,686.5 km2) in size.
 Average water depth 11.5 feet (3.5 m) in spring; <0.5 ft (15 cm) in late July through September.
 Water sources from snowmelt and numerous springs; main inflow via Willow, Eagle, and Gravel Creeks on the east and south, and Crane Creek on the west.
 Original water outlet, Grays Lake Outlet, drains to the north into Snake River via Willow Creek.
 Clark's Cut, a man-made channel completed in 1924, drains into the Blackfoot Reservoir via Meadow creek.
 Water discharge controlled by the Bureau of Indian Affairs for use in Fort Hall Irrigation Project since the early 1920s.
 Drainage canals and drainage ditches were established during various periods (1920s, 1950s, 1960s).

Geology

 Meade Thrust Fault principle structure underlying basin.
 Cretaceous rocks underlie Willow, Eagle, and Bridge Creeks, predominantly sandstones and shales.
 Paleozoic and Triassic rocks underlie Gravel Creek basin, predominantly carbonates with Quaternary alluvium covering lowlands.
 Tertiary volcanics (mainly olivine basalts) underlie most western drainage.
 Bear Island olivine basalt.

Access and wildlife viewing

 Public road perimeter allows excellent bird viewing, particularly in May and early June when water levels are high.
 Viewing opportunities from Beavertail Point (south), refuge observation area (east), and north perimeter road.
 Access into marsh largely closed to the public to minimize disturbance of breeding sandhill cranes, trumpeter swans, and other waterbirds.
 Small Visitors Center at refuge headquarters; no other public facilities available.
 Access during fall waterfowl hunting on north half of basin.

Grays Lake National Wildlife Refuge

 Established 1965 for production of migratory waterfowl and other waterbirds
 Total area within proposed refuge boundary 
 Active research program for adaptive management of habitat and wildlife populations.
 Management of grasslands and wet meadow using prescribed fire, grazing, idling, haying, and rotation systems.

References

External links
Map of the area
Images from Grays Lake NWR

Lakes of Bonneville County, Idaho
Lakes of Caribou County, Idaho
Wetlands of Idaho